Plataneros de Corozal is a professional volleyball team based in Corozal, Puerto Rico. They play in the Puerto Rican Liga de Voleibol Superior Masculino.

Season 2013-2014

Achievements
National competitions
 Liga de Voleibol Superior Masculino (9)
 Winner: 1977, 1980, 1981, 1982, 1983, 1984, 1987, 2008, 2009
 2nd place: 1976, 1981, 1983, 1985, 1986, 1990, 1991, 1992, 1993, 1994, 2004, 2010
International competitions
 FIVB Volleyball Men's Club World Championship
 5th place: 1992, 2009

References

External links

Volleyball in Puerto Rico
1970 establishments in Puerto Rico